Acanthosaura longicaudata, the  long-tailed horned tree lizard or long-tailed horned agamid, is a species of agama found in China.

References

longicaudata
Reptiles of China
Reptiles described in 2022